The lac Archambault is a lake located at Saint-Donat, in the Matawinie Regional County Municipality, in Lanaudière, in Quebec, Canada. Its discharge drains to the southeast in Lake Ouareau. This lake is located on the line separating the townships of Archambault and Lussier, immediately west of Lake Ouareau into which it flows.

Recreational and tourist activities, especially vacationing, are the main economic activity around the lake; forestry, second. The shores all around Lake Archambault are highly renowned for vacationing, particularly because of the forest, mountain environment, recreational tourism, road access and its position south of the Mont-Tremblant National Park. The village of Saint-Donat-de-Montcalm, an imposing resort and service center, is located on the peninsula between the eastern shore of Lake Archambault and the western shore of Lake Ouareau.

The lake Archambault is surrounded by Régimbald road. The route 125 passes in the village of Saint-Donat and the route 329 serve the eastern part du lac.

The surface of Lake Archambault is generally frozen from the beginning of December to the end of March; safe circulation on the ice is generally done from the end of December to the beginning of March.

Geography 
The main neighboring hydrographic slopes are:
 north side: Lac Provost, Matawin River;
 east side: Lake Ouareau, Ouareau River;
 south side: Lac de la Montagne Noire,
 west side: Saint-Michel River, Le Boulé River, Saint-Martin stream.

Lake Archambault takes the form of a zigzag (north–south orientation) becoming narrower in the southern bay. The northern part of the lake has two bays: baie de l'Ours (Bear Bay) (to the northwest) and Tire Lake (to the northeast). A peninsula attached to the west bank extends  to the east, delimiting the bay from the south which stretches  to the south. This bay surrounded by resorts is located at the foot of Mont Gaudet (peaking at ) and Mont Jasper (peaking at ).

Toponymy 
.

From 1915, vacationers interested in hunting, fishing and the outdoors settled on the banks. Since that time, the recreotourism vocation of the region is in continuous growth.

The toponym "lac Archambault" would evoke, as for the canton, the patronymic of the notary Louis Archambeault or Archambault (1814-1890), deputy, minister and legislative adviser. As early as 1880, Eugène Taché also registered "L. Archambault ”as well as the homonymous canton on its map of Quebec. Lac Archambault, listed as Archambeault in the Nomenclature of Geographical Names for the Province of Quebec in 1916, was once used for particularly intense logging in the second half of the 19th century.

Pictures

See also 

 Matawinie Regional County Municipality
 Saint-Donat
 Saint-Michel River
 Lake Ouareau
 Ouareau River
 List of lakes of Canada

Notes and references 

Lakes of Lanaudière